The Foxboro Grange Hall is a historic Grange building at 11–15 Bird Street in Foxborough, Massachusetts.  It is a three-story wood-frame structure, five bays wide at the upper levels and three storefronts wide on the first level, with a hip roof and clapboard siding.  Built in 1897, it is one of few wood-frame commercial buildings in the town, and is a reminder of the town's agricultural past for its historic use as a Grange hall.  The first floor has been adapted for retail use.

The hall was listed on the National Register of Historic Places in 1983.

See also
National Register of Historic Places listings in Norfolk County, Massachusetts

References

Grange organizations and buildings in Massachusetts
Clubhouses on the National Register of Historic Places in Massachusetts
Grange buildings on the National Register of Historic Places
Buildings and structures in Foxborough, Massachusetts
National Register of Historic Places in Norfolk County, Massachusetts